Vanhoenacker is a surname. Notable people with the surname include:

 Marino Vanhoenacker (born 1976), Belgian triathlete
 Mark Vanhoenacker (born 1974), Belgian-American pilot and author